Durham Ox is a small rural locality in the Shire of Loddon in Victoria, Australia. It is situated near the Serpentine Creek, a tributary of the Loddon River. This is a highly valuable natural resource to both the local tourism and agricultural economies.

This small but vibrant community is widely known because of the 'OX' landmark that lies on the Loddon Valley Highway. The 'OX' stands next to the former Durham Ox Store site which was destroyed by a fire in September 1996 and never rebuilt. Post boxes, bus stop, telephone box and a parking area also mark this spot. The name and image on the landmark are derived from the Durham Ox, a prize 19th-century bull.

In the 2011 flood event, the Serpentine creek which runs close to the town, overflowed and inundated several houses in the area, as well as the Durham Ox Memorial Hall, the Durham Ox Church, and the historic Durham Ox Inn. The church was lost to fire some time later.

References

External links

Towns in Victoria (Australia)
Shire of Loddon